The Chorister School was a co-educational independent school for the 3 to 13 age range. It consisted of a Pre-School (opened in September 2008), a pre-preparatory and preparatory day and boarding school in Durham, England. It was set in an enviable position on a World Heritage Site, in a range of Grade I listed buildings adjacent to Durham Cathedral, surrounded by the woodlands and riverbanks of the River Wear.

The majority of the pupils at the school attended on a 'day' basis, with about 45 boarders of both sexes making up the balance.  Pupils did not have to be Cathedral choristers, but those boys and girls who were choristers could be either boarders or day pupils. Pupils were taught in small classes in a collection of historic buildings all of which formed part of the college, or cathedral close.

The Chorister School merged with nearby Durham School, closing 28 September 2021.

History
Its creation dates back to 1416 as a school for the cathedral's choirboys. Whilst historically the school had fewer pupils, from 5 to 24, ages 8 to 20, expansion began in 1948 to reach the numbers of today. This necessitated a number of moves of building in the cathedral area. The school became co-educational in 1994. On 28 September 2021 the school closed as a result of a merger with Durham School.

Choristers 
All Durham Cathedral choristers attend The Chorister School.

The Durham Cathedral Choir consists of 20 girl choristers and 20 boy choristers who sing separately alongside the 12 adults of the choir. Choristers typically join the choir between the ages of 7 and 9 and remain until the age of 13.

The choristers receive a discounted education as boarding or day pupils. Further means tested financial support can be provided.  Choristers are able to participate fully in all of the extra-curricular activities that the school offers, including drama and sport.

Choristers receive a first class musical education and experience performing to the highest of standards in one of Britain's favourite buildings. The majority of the choir's singing takes place during the daily worship of Durham Cathedral. However, the choir also takes part in concerts, recordings, live broadcasts on the radio and tours.

Music 
Music was a huge part of the school with many school choirs and a variety of ensembles that perform regularly during the year.  A wide range of specialist music teachers offered tuition in a range of instruments.  Many pupils left the school at the end of Year 8 with music scholarships to their chosen next school.

Academic studies 
A broad curriculum was offered to the pupils, tailored to the needs of today but with traditional elements, covering all of the national curriculum subjects but also French and Latin, and from Year 7, Critical Thinking and Mandarin.  Pupils worked towards reaching Common Entrance level by the end of Year 8.  Many pupils left the school at the end of Year 8 with academic scholarships to their chosen next school.

Sport 
Sports facilities were impressive with a purpose built sports hall and two spacious and picturesque playing fields. The school played a wide range of sports, with pupils from Year 3 upwards competing against both independent and state schools with great success.  Many pupils competed both locally and nationally in wide range of sports and activities. The school also had a competing equestrian team and rowing club.  Many pupils left the school at Year 8 with sports scholarships to their chosen next school.

Drama 
Drama at The Chorister School was a key part of the academic and extra-curricular provision. Productions were varied and took place throughout the year for pupils from Pre-School upwards

Head teachers 

 Henry Madden: 1876–?
 F. S. Dennett: 1914–1929
 Henry Yorke Ganderton: 1929–1957
 John M. Grove: 1957–1978
 Raymond G Lawrence: 1978–1994
 Stephen Drew: 1994–2003
 Ian Hawksby: 2003–2010
 Lin Lawrence (interim): 2010
 Yvette Day: 2011–2017
 Ian Wicks: 2018—2021

Notable former pupils

Roger Lord (1924-2014), Principal Oboist, London Symphony Orchestra (1953-1986). Husband to Madeleine Dring, he edited and published many of her works as well as his own in later life.
Francis Habgood (born 1964), chief constable 
Rowan Atkinson (born 1955), comedian and actor known for Blackadder and "Mr. Bean"
Tony Blair (born 1953), former Prime Minister of the United Kingdom
James Fenton (born 1949), poet, journalist and literary critic
Christopher Hancock (1928–2004), actor
Stephen Hancock (younger brother of Christopher), actor, who played Ernest Bishop in Coronation Street
Sir John Laws (born 1945), The Rt Hon Lord Justice Laws, High Court Judge between 1992 and 1999, when he came to the Court of Appeal
Paddy MacDee (Patrick McDermott) (born c. 1950), radio programme host
Sir Peter Vardy (born 1947), businessman
James Wood (born 1965), Professor of the Practice of Literary Criticism at Harvard University and contributor to The New Yorker
Ralph Woodward (born 1971), musician
Hall Charlton (born 1979), scrum half for Newcastle Falcons

References

External links 
 School website
 Profile on the ISC website

1416 establishments in England
Boarding schools in County Durham
Choir schools in England
Schools in Durham, England
Educational institutions established in the 15th century
Defunct schools in County Durham
Cathedral schools
Grade I listed buildings in County Durham
Grade I listed educational buildings
Defunct Church of England schools
Durham Cathedral
Educational institutions disestablished in 2021
2021 disestablishments in England